Mark Fergus and Hawk Ostby are screenwriters best known for their work on Children of Men (for which they were nominated for the Academy Award for Best Adapted Screenplay) and Iron Man. Their other work includes First Snow, which was also directed by Fergus, and Cowboys & Aliens.

They are the creators and executive producers of the TV series The Expanse, which debuted on Syfy in December 2015.

References

External links

Living people
Place of birth missing (living people)
Year of birth missing (living people)
21st-century American male writers
American male screenwriters
Hugo Award-winning writers
Screenwriting duos